The Changan Joice is a MPV produced by Changan Automobile.

Overview
Launched in 2007, the Changan Joice is a 7-seater MPV. The powertrain of the Changan Joice features a 2.0 liter 4-Cylinder petrol engine producing 112 kW and 192 Nm of torque mated to a 5-speed manual or automatic transmission.

Changan Jiexun HEV
Launched in 2008, the Changan Jiexun HEV is China's first domestic-brand hybrid vehicle. The fuel economy of the Jiexun HEV is improved 20 percent when compared to the non-hybrid version launched in 2007, and the emissions of the Changan Jiexun HEV meets EU-IV emission standards. Changan Automobiles invested 300 million yuan ($40.7 million) in researching and developing the Changan Jiexun HEV for production.

References

External links
Chana Global Official website 

Joice
Minivans
Compact MPVs
Front-wheel-drive vehicles
Cars of China
Cars introduced in 2007